Ecco or ECCO may refer to:

Art and entertainment 
 Ecco the Dolphin (series), a series of action-adventure science fiction video games
 Ecco the Dolphin, a 1992 video game
 Ecco (Gotham), a TV series character

Organizations 
 ECCO, a Danish shoe manufacturer
 Ecco Press, an imprint of the multinational publisher HarperCollins
 Eighteenth Century Collections Online, a digital library of books published in the British Empire between 1701 and 1800
 ECCO, a cancer summit run by the European Cancer Organisation
 European Confederation of Conservator-Restorers' Organisations, a non-governmental professional organisation
 East Calhoun Community Organization, in Minneapolis, Minnesota

Other uses 
 Encyclopedia of Chinese Chess Openings, a classification of all possible openings in Chinese Chess
 Earth Coincidence Control Office, a concept of super intelligent entities described by John C. Lilly
 Ecco Pro, personal information manager software

See also
 "Ecco, ridente in cielo", a cavatina from The Barber of Seville

 EC (disambiguation) for companies named EC (EC Co)
 Echo (disambiguation)
 Eco (disambiguation)
 Eko (disambiguation)
 Ekko (disambiguation)
 
 
 Eckō Unltd., a clothing brand
 EKCO, a British electronics company